Standard is the fifth studio album by Japanese pop rock band, Scandal. The album was released on October 2, 2013 by Epic Records Japan. It is available in three different editions, Complete Production, Limited and Regular. The Complete Production Edition came with a T-shirt, while the Limited Edition came with a DVD including the music videos for "Awanai Tsumori no, Genki de ne", "Kagen no Tsuki", and "Scandal in the House".

Track listing

Personnel
HARUNA (Haruna Ono) - lead vocals, rhythm guitar
MAMI (Mami Sasazaki) - lead guitar, vocals
TOMOMI (Tomomi Ogawa) - bass, vocals
RINA (Rina Suzuki) - drums, vocals

References

2013 albums
Japanese-language albums
Scandal (Japanese band) albums
Epic Records albums